Charles Yanofsky (April 17, 1925 – March 16, 2018) was an American geneticist on the faculty of Stanford University who contributed to the establishment of the one gene-one enzyme hypothesis and discovered attenuation, a riboswitch mechanism in which messenger RNA changes shape in response to a small molecule and thus alters its binding ability for the regulatory region of a gene or operon.

Education and early life
Charles Yanofsky was born on April 17, 1925 in New York.  He was one of the earliest graduates of the Bronx High School of Science, then studied at the City College of New York and completed his degree in biochemistry in spite of having had his education interrupted by military service in World War II including participation in the Battle of the Bulge.  In 1948, having returned and completed college, he took up graduate work towards his master's degree and PhD, both granted by Yale University.  He pursued postdoctoral work at Yale for a time, completing work started during his PhD training.

Career and research
Yanofsky joined the Case Western Reserve Medical School faculty in 1954.  He moved to the faculty at Stanford University as an Associate Professor in 1958.  In 1964, Yanofsky and colleagues established that gene sequences and protein sequences are colinear in bacteria.  Yanofsky showed that changes in DNA sequence can produce changes in protein sequence at corresponding positions. His work is considered the best evidence in favor of the one gene-one enzyme hypothesis.

His laboratory also revealed how controlled alterations in RNA shapes allow RNA to serve as a regulatory molecule in both bacterial and animal cells. His graduate student Iwona Stroynowski and Mitzi Kuroda discovered the process of attenuation of expression based on regulated binding ability of the five-prime untranslated region of the messenger RNA for the bacterial tryptophan operon. They had thus discovered the first regulatory riboswitch, although that terminology was not used until later. Yanofsky and his other collaborators then extended this work showing how mRNAs responded allosterically to a small molecule signal by changing shape and therefore changing ability to bind to the regulatory region of each operon.  They showed that this mechanism applied to other amino acid biosynthesis and degradation operons of bacteria and to animal cell genes.

In 1980, Yanofsky and other Stanford scientists founded DNAX, a Palo Alto-based research institute subsequently acquired by Schering-Plough.

Yanofsky died in Palo Alto, California. At the time of death, he was the Morris Herzstein Professor of Biology and Molecular Biology (Emeritus) in the Department of Biology at Stanford University.

Personal life 
Charles Yanofsky's first wife Carol died of breast cancer in 1990. He was survived by his second wife, Edna, and three sons.

Awards and honors 
Charles Yanofsky received the Albert Lasker Basic Medical Research Award, sometimes referred to as the American Nobel prize, in 1971.  Yanofsky was awarded the Selman A. Waksman Award in Microbiology from the National Academy of Sciences in 1972  and was co-recipient of the Louisa Gross Horwitz Prize from Columbia University in 1976 with Seymour Benzer. Yanofsky was elected a foreign member of the Royal Society in 1985 and was one of the recipients of the 2003 National Medal of Science awards.

Major Publications

References

1925 births
2018 deaths
American geneticists
Jewish American scientists
National Medal of Science laureates
Members of the United States National Academy of Sciences
Foreign Members of the Royal Society
Yale University alumni
Stanford University Department of Biology faculty
Recipients of the Albert Lasker Award for Basic Medical Research
City College of New York alumni
20th-century American biologists
21st-century American scientists
21st-century biologists
United States Army personnel of World War II
21st-century American Jews
Scientists from New York City